Myxilla is a genus of demosponge belonging to the family Myxillidae. These sponges usually form encrustations on rock surfaces.

Species
The following species are recognized in the genus Myxilla:

 Subgenus Myxilla (Burtonanchora) Laubenfels, 1936
 Myxilla (Burtonanchora) araucana Hajdu, Desqueyroux-Faúndez, Carvalho, Lôbo-Hajdu & Willenz, 2013
 Myxilla (Burtonanchora) asigmata (Topsent, 1901)
 Myxilla (Burtonanchora) asymmetrica Desqueyroux-Faúndez & van Soest, 1996
 Myxilla (Burtonanchora) crucifera Wilson, 1925
 Myxilla (Burtonanchora) gracilis (Lévi, 1965)
 Myxilla (Burtonanchora) hastata Ridley & Dendy, 1886
 Myxilla (Burtonanchora) lissostyla Burton, 1938
 Myxilla (Burtonanchora) myxilloides (Lévi, 1960)
 Myxilla (Burtonanchora) pedunculata Lundbeck, 1905
 Myxilla (Burtonanchora) pistillaris Topsent, 1916
 Myxilla (Burtonanchora) ponceti Goodwin, Brewin & Brickle, 2012
 Myxilla (Burtonanchora) sigmatifera (Lévi, 1963)
 Subgenus Myxilla (Ectyomyxilla) Hentschel, 1914
 Myxilla (Ectyomyxilla) arenaria Dendy, 1905
 Myxilla (Ectyomyxilla) beauchenensis Goodwin, Jones, Neely & Brickle, 2016
 Myxilla (Ectyomyxilla) chilensis Thiele, 1905
 Myxilla (Ectyomyxilla) dracula Desqueyroux-Faúndez & van Soest, 1996
 Myxilla (Ectyomyxilla) hentscheli Burton, 1929
 Myxilla (Ectyomyxilla) janeae Van Soest & Hooper, 2020
 Myxilla (Ectyomyxilla) kerguelensis (Hentschel, 1914)
 Myxilla (Ectyomyxilla) mariana Ridley & Dendy, 1886
 Myxilla (Ectyomyxilla) massa Ridley & Dendy, 1887
 Myxilla (Ectyomyxilla) methanophila (Maldonado & Young, 1998)
 Myxilla (Ectyomyxilla) parasitica Lambe, 1893
 Myxilla (Ectyomyxilla) tornotata Brøndsted, 1924
 Subgenus Myxilla (Myxilla) Schmidt, 1862
 Myxilla (Myxilla) acribria de Laubenfels, 1942
 Myxilla (Myxilla) agennes de Laubenfels, 1930
 Myxilla (Myxilla) austini Ott, Reiswig, McDaniel & Harbo, 2019
 Myxilla (Myxilla) australis (Topsent, 1901)
 Myxilla (Myxilla) barentsi Vosmaer, 1885
 Myxilla (Myxilla) basimucronata Burton, 1932
 Myxilla (Myxilla) behringensis Lambe, 1895
 Myxilla (Myxilla) bivalvia Tanita, 1967
 Myxilla (Myxilla) burtoni Van Soest & Hooper, 2020
 Myxilla (Myxilla) caliciformis Sarà, 1978
 Myxilla (Myxilla) columna Bergquist & Fromont, 1988
 Myxilla (Myxilla) compressa Ridley & Dendy, 1886
 Myxilla (Myxilla) crassa (Bowerbank, 1875)
 Myxilla (Myxilla) dentata (Topsent, 1904)
 Myxilla (Myxilla) distorta Burton, 1954
 Myxilla (Myxilla) diversiancorata Lundbeck, 1905
 Myxilla (Myxilla) elastica Koltun, 1958
 Myxilla (Myxilla) elongata Topsent, 1917
 Myxilla (Myxilla) fibrosa Levinsen, 1893
 Myxilla (Myxilla) fimbriata (Bowerbank, 1866)
 Myxilla (Myxilla) flexitornota Rezvoi, 1925
 Myxilla (Myxilla) fusca (Whitelegge, 1906)
 Myxilla (Myxilla) hastatispiculata Swartschevsky, 1905
 Myxilla (Myxilla) hiradoensis Hoshino, 1981
 Myxilla (Myxilla) incrustans (Johnston, 1842)
 Myxilla (Myxilla) inequitornota Burton, 1931
 Myxilla (Myxilla) insolens Koltun, 1964
 Myxilla (Myxilla) iophonoides Swartschevsky, 1906
 Myxilla (Myxilla) iotrochotina (Topsent, 1892)
 Myxilla (Myxilla) lacunosa Lambe, 1893
 Myxilla (Myxilla) lobata Hoshino, 1981
 Myxilla (Myxilla) macrosigma Boury-Esnault, 1971
 Myxilla (Myxilla) mexicensis Dickinson, 1945
 Myxilla (Myxilla) mirabilis (Whitelegge, 1907)
 Myxilla (Myxilla) mollis Ridley & Dendy, 1886
 Myxilla (Myxilla) mucronata Pulitzer-Finali, 1986
 Myxilla (Myxilla) nodaspera (Topsent, 1913)
 Myxilla (Myxilla) novaezealandiae Dendy, 1924
 Myxilla (Myxilla) perspinosa Lundbeck, 1905
 Myxilla (Myxilla) producta Hoshino, 1981
 Myxilla (Myxilla) prouhoi (Topsent, 1892)
 Myxilla (Myxilla) pumicea (Whitelegge, 1906)
 Myxilla (Myxilla) ramosa Kieschnick, 1896
 Myxilla (Myxilla) reses (Topsent, 1892)
 Myxilla (Myxilla) rosacea (Lieberkühn, 1859)
 Myxilla (Myxilla) septentrionalis Fristedt, 1887
 Myxilla (Myxilla) setoensis Tanita, 1961
 Myxilla (Myxilla) seychellensis Thomas, 1981
 Myxilla (Myxilla) simplex (Baer, 1906)
 Myxilla (Myxilla) swartschewskii Burton, 1930
 Myxilla (Myxilla) tarifensis Carballo & García-Goméz, 1996
 Myxilla (Myxilla) victoriana Dendy, 1896
 Subgenus Myxilla (Styloptilon) Cabioch, 1968
 Myxilla (Styloptilon) acanthotornota Goodwin, Jones, Neely & Brickle, 2011
 Myxilla (Styloptilon) ancorata (Cabioch, 1968)
 Myxilla (Styloptilon) canepai Schejter, Bertolino, Calcinai, Cerrano & Bremec, 2011
 Myxilla (Styloptilon) fromontae Van Soest & Hooper, 2020
 Subgenus unassigned
 Myxilla brunnea Hansen, 1885
 †Myxilla dendyi Hinde & Holmes, 1892
 Myxilla funalis (Bowerbank in Jeffreys & Norman, 1875)

References

Myxilla at Encyclopedia of Life

Poecilosclerida
Taxa named by Eduard Oscar Schmidt